Simochromis diagramma is a species of cichlid endemic to Lake Tanganyika where it prefers murky waters with rock-rubble substrates usually at less than  and never deeper than .  It can reach a length of  TL.  It can also be found in the aquarium trade.

References

External links 
 Photograph

Simochromis
Taxa named by Albert Günther
Taxonomy articles created by Polbot
Fish described in 1893